N. Ramaseshaiah or Nutakki Ramaseshaiah (29 September 1897 – 1 June 1969) was an Indian lawyer, politician and Member of Parliament.

Early life and education
Ramaseshaiah was born to Shri Nutakki Uddande Ramaiah at Chiluvuru, Guntur district on 29 September 1897. He was educated at Presidency College and Madras Law College, Madras. Ramaseshaiah married Shrimati N. Punnamma on 14 May 1924. They had two sons and two daughters.

Career in law and politics
Ramaseshaiah has practiced Law in Vijayawada. He worked as assistant Diwan and later as Diwan in Jaipur Samsthanam and was closely associated with Velagapudi Ramakrishna. In 1952, he was elected to 1st Lok Sabha from Parvathipuram (Lok Sabha constituency) as an Independent candidate.

He was elected to the Jaipur Assembly constituency in Orissa as a member of Swatantra Party and held the position of Minister of Health for the Government of Orissa. In 1962, he contested the 3rd Lok Sabha from Nowrangapur constituency and lost.

Later life
Vedula Satyanarayana Sastry dedicated his Deepavali Khandakavyam to him. He died on 1 June 1969.

References

External links
 Biodata of N. Ramaseshaiah at Lok Sabha website.

Telugu politicians
India MPs 1952–1957
1897 births
1969 deaths
20th-century Indian lawyers
Indian dewans
Swatantra Party politicians
Lok Sabha members from Andhra Pradesh
People from Guntur district